The Institution of Agricultural Engineers (IAgrE) is a British professional engineering institution founded in 1938.  It is licensed by the Engineering Council to assess candidates for inclusion on its Register of professional Engineers and Technicians.

Function
The IAgrE is the professional body for engineers, scientists, technologists and managers in agricultural and allied landbased industries, including forestry, food engineering and technology, amenity, renewable energy, horticulture and the environment.

As a founding Constituent Body (CB) of the Society for the Environment, IAgrE also assesses suitably qualified and experienced candidates for registration as Chartered Environmentalists (CEnv).

See also 
 Chartered Engineer
 Chartered Environmentalist
 Incorporated Engineer
 Engineering Technician

IAgrE also runs two technician accreditation schemes for the sector:
 Landbased Technician Accreditation (LTA) scheme for field equipment (on behalf of the Agricultural Engineers Association) (AEA)
 Landbased Technician Accreditation Scheme (LTAMEA) for the Milking Equipment Association (MEA)

External links 
 Institution of Agricultural Engineers

Engineering societies based in the United Kingdom
ECUK Licensed Members
Agricultural engineers
Organisations based in Bedfordshire
Organizations established in 1938
Agricultural organisations based in England